Joan Luque Prados (born 16 June 1992) is a Spanish semi-professional footballer who plays as a winger for Maidstone United.

Club career

Early career
Born in Barcelona, Catalonia, Luque spent two years with FC Barcelona between the ages of 11 and 13. After Barcelona he played for Damm and Gramenet. He also participated in the 2010 Copa del Rey Juvenil with Cornellà, after a short stint with Europa.

Luque started his senior career with Gramenet's reserve team, in the regional leagues. On 7 June 2012, he agreed to a contract with Montañesa in the fourth division, but was deemed surplus to requirements and moved to fellow league team Vilassar de Mar.

On 15 June 2013, Luque joined fellow fourth-tier side Santboià, but left for Sabadell B on the following 21 February. On 8 August 2014, he signed for Sant Rafel, still in the fourth level, and signed a new one-year contract the following 27 May 2015.

In July 2016, Luque joined Llosetense, freshly relegated from Segunda División B.

Heybridge Swifts
In July 2017 he was one of 21 players from Spain, Andorra and Argentina who trained with English non-League club Heybridge Swifts as part of an initiative set up by Heybridge Swifts player Guillem Ramón. He signed for the club, combining his playing career with working as a waiter in a restaurant. He scored six goals for the club in their 2017–18 FA Cup run.

He was voted as Heybridge's Player of the Month by the fans twice – in August 2017 and September 2017, and was named to the Isthmian League Team of the Year for the 2017–18 season. He scored 30 goals for Heybridge in all competitions, including 17 in the league.

Lincoln City
After a successful pre-season trial, Luque joined EFL League Two club Lincoln City on six-month contract on 9 August 2018. On 25 August, he made his professional debut, coming on as a 90th minute substitute for Bruno Andrade in a 3–1 home win against Notts County. Three days later, he scored first goal for the club in a 1–4 loss at Blackburn Rovers in the EFL Cup.

Luque moved on loan to National League side Bromley on 21 September 2018. After making 5 appearances in all competitions for Bromley, he was recalled by Lincoln in December 2018. He was released by Lincoln on 2 January 2019.

Return to non-league

He signed for Concord Rangers later that month. He moved to Dagenham & Redbridge in May 2019.

In October 2020 his contract was terminated by mutual consent and he subsequently signed for National League South side Maidstone United, with the Stones assistant manager, Terry Harris, instrumental in bringing Luque to the club.

On 23 January 2021 he signed for Weymouth. He left the club in April after ten appearances.

In June 2021, Luque returned to Maidstone United. Following Maidstone's title win, Luque was named National League South Player of the Year for the 2021–22.

Club statistics

References

1992 births
Living people
Footballers from Barcelona
Spanish footballers
Association football wingers
Tercera División players
UDA Gramenet footballers
CF Montañesa players
UE Vilassar de Mar players
FC Santboià players
CE Sabadell FC B players
CD Llosetense players
English Football League players
Isthmian League players
Heybridge Swifts F.C. players
Lincoln City F.C. players
Bromley F.C. players
Concord Rangers F.C. players
Maidstone United F.C. players
Dagenham & Redbridge F.C. players
Spanish expatriate footballers
Expatriate footballers in England
Spanish expatriate sportspeople in England
Weymouth F.C. players